Tony Lee Scott is an Australian pop singer, who released two singles in the early 2000s.

Early life
Tony Lee Scott was born and raised on a wheat farm in Queensland's Darling Downs to a Scottish father and a Maori mother. Tony's father played in a country music band.

Discography

Singles

References

Living people
Australian male singer-songwriters
Year of birth missing (living people)